Estherville Municipal Airport  is a public general aviation airport located four miles (six kilometers) east of Estherville, Emmet County, Iowa, United States. It is owned by the City of Estherville.

Facilities and aircraft 
As of October 6, 2022, there were 18 aircraft based there, including 17 single-engine and one twin-engine. For the 12-month period ending September 4, 2020, there were an average of 24 aircraft operations per day, all of which were general aviation. The airport hosts flight training for students of Iowa Lakes Community College's aviation program.

References

External links 

Airports in Iowa
Buildings and structures in Emmet County, Iowa